Julio Colombo (born 22 February 1984) is a French former professional footballer who played as a defender for Montpellier HSC. In June 2015, he was arrested by the police during an anti-drug operation.

Personal life
On 15 June 2015, Colombo was arrested by the police during "Hyphen", an anti-drug operation led by France and Italy. The police dismantled an international drug trafficking linked to the Calabrian mafia "'Ndrangheta" questioning 17 suspected criminals including three members of an influential Italian clan. Colombo was one of 12 people jailed in France.

References

External links
 
 

1984 births
Living people
Association football defenders
French footballers
Guadeloupean footballers
France youth international footballers
Montpellier HSC players